Owen Crowe (born 1982) is a Canadian professional poker player from Halifax, Nova Scotia.  he is known for having had four final tables in the past four years at the World Series of Poker (WSOP) in large-field  or US$1,500 events, two top-100 finishes in the WSOP main events in the prior three years, and a 5th place finish at the 2013 PokerStars Caribbean Adventure main event.  He was also successful in the inaugural Canadian Championships of Online Poker in 2010 and has greater online earning than live cash game earnings.

Career
, Crowe had 10 WSOP in the money finishes (2005 – 2, 2008 – 2, 2009 – 2, 2010 – 2, 2011–2) and a World Poker Tour cash finish.  He has 4 final tables at WSOP events with average field size of 2714 – all in a smaller buy-in, large field No Limit Hold’em events.  His final tables were 2008 – Event 36 8/2447, 2009 – Event 51 5/2781, 2010 – Event 45 2/3128, and 2011 – Event 28 4/2500. , Crowe had US$1,684,993 live earnings.

, Crowe had US$2,701,683 online earnings. He plays online under the name "ocrowe" at Full Tilt Poker, Pokerstars and Ultimate Bet as well as "Adan12" at Full Tilt. In 2010, he made 3 final tables in 11 events during the inaugural Canadian Championships of Online Poker hosted by PokerStars. His largest online cash was at the  Main Event at the 2008 WSOP when he earned .

World Series of Poker

Final tables

Main Event ITM

References

External links
 Cardplayer.com profile
 Hendonmob profile
 Bluff Magazine profile
 WSOP.com profile

1982 births
Canadian poker players
Living people
People from Halifax, Nova Scotia